Francis Plowden may refer to:

 Francis Plowden (politician) (c.1644–1712), English Jacobite official
 Francis Plowden (barrister) (1749–1829), English Jesuit, barrister and writer
 Francis Plowden (British Army officer) (1851–1911), British general
 Francis Plowden (businessman) (born 1945), British businessman